Faisal Darwish may refer to:
 Faisal Darwish (footballer, born 1991), Saudi Arabian footballer
 Faisal Darwish (footballer, born 1996), Saudi Arabian footballer